John Metcalfe may refer to:
 John Metcalfe (composer), British-based composer and violist
 John Metcalfe (writer) (1891–1965), British science fiction and horror writer
 Jack Metcalfe (1912–1994), Australian athlete
 John Metcalfe (footballer) (1935–1996), English professional footballer
 John Metcalfe (librarian) (1901–1982), Australian librarian
 John Francis Metcalfe (1908–1975), British Army general

See also
 John Metcalf (disambiguation)